Love And Other Catastrophes is the debut studio album by the Wakefield band, Skint & Demoralised. The album was written in 2007, recorded in 2008 and planned for release in 2009. Full-length promotional copies leaked heavily on the internet over the summer of 2009 and the band were dropped by their old label at the expense of the planned release. However, it was officially released on 2 August 2011 on Heist or Hit Records alongside the band's follow-up.

Track listing

Personnel
Written by Abbott/Gledhill
Produced by MiNI dOG
Performed by The Dap-Kings, David Gledhill, Tracey Wilkinson, Eddie Hick, Matt Abbott
Mixed by MiNI dOG, except for tracks 3, 5, 8, 9 and 11 which were mixed by Jeremy Wheatley
Engineered by Ewan Davies and Richard Woodcraft
Mastered by Tim Young
Artwork designed by Nathan McGrory

Notes
Recorded at The Daptone Studios in New York, RAK Studios in London and 6x7 Studios in Sheffield
Mastered at Metropolis Studios

Recording and production
After signing a deal with Mercury Records, the duo were flown out to New York City to begin recording with legendary soul session band The Dap-Kings at their studio in Brooklyn. Additional work was added at their home studio in Sheffield before sessions were completed at RAK Studios in London.

The album was produced by MiNI dOG, which allowed Skint & Demoralised to retain full creative control. As well as the authentic sounds of The Dap-Kings, a full orchestra was recorded for tracks 6 and 12.

On the original full-length promotional copy that was distributed in 2009 - the reason for the album 'leaking' heavily on Illegal file sharing sites - there were spoken word interludes included on the track-listing. These included Abbott's distinctive poems, although they were removed from the official 2011 release.

Critical reception
The album never received its official release during the promotional cycle in 2008 and 2009, although the band received high critical praise around this time. A full-page feature in the Sunday Times Culture Magazine highlighted their popularity amongst broadsheet journalists. They were tipped for success across the board, including a feature in The Guardian at the start of 2009.

References

2011 debut albums